Sim (born Simon Jacques Eugène Berryer; 21 July 1926 – 6 September 2009) was a French humourist, writer and comedian.

He was part of the team on Les Grosses Têtes, a radio and TV programme. He also played the part of Geriatrix in the films Asterix and Obelix vs Caesar and Astérix at the Olympic Games.

Biography 
Simon Jacques Eugène was born on 21 July 1926 to engineer Henri Berryer and his wife Marie-Thérèse (née Bonnemazou). At the time of his birth, Henri was an electrician for the director Abel Gance and grip on the film Napoléon.

Childhood 
The family lived in a small flat in the Rue du Fer-à-Moulin, a cinema district in the 5th arrondissement of Paris, where  Simon spent the most part of his earliest years at flats 26, then 28. Very early on, his Russian uncle working at  Synchro-Standard took Berryer to see the first talking pictures, which he would remember all his life.

In 1936, the family moved to Nantes when Berryer senior found work as a technician at Le Majestic cinema (later L'Olympic, then La Fabrique).

Adolescence 
At the age of eleven, Barryer founded a comedy group called "Sim-Art". (age fourteen, according to other sources). In 1939, with his friend Jojo, Sim got his first award in a funny face competition organised on 15 August at  Saint-Julien-de-Concelles. Age fourteen, they played truant and performed sketches in a cellar, with fake letters to their school justifying their absence. Simon later studied at De Launey technical college in Nantes.

In 1941 his parents took over a cinema, L'Éden, in the small town of Ancenis (between Nantes and Angers). The family moved from Nantes to Ancenis en 1942 and reopened the cinema. Sim continued his studies at the Joubert d'Ancenis lycée and worked as projectionist in the family business.

Theatre 
In 1946, the Berryer family stopped working at the  Ancenis to start a film distribution company at Rennes, without success. The Berryer parents returned to Ancenis but Sim – now married – stayed in Rennes as a projectionist at Le Royal. This venue also staged musical performances, so Sim saw performances from Edith Piaf, Yves Montand, Henri Salvador, Maurice Chevalier, among others. He practiced his comedy, alone, after the performances. He won a contract as a humorous singer in a ballroom. He was spotted by Étienne Perrin, with whom he performed a comic clown act Etty et Balta.

At the end of 1953, he toured as a comic song act in the Paris cabaret clubs, often in drag, as at Madame Arthur in Montmartre. He also worked at the Crazy Horse Saloon as a dresser. This stage of his career would be resurrected in Elle boit pas, elle fume pas, elle drague pas, mais... elle cause ! by  Michel Audiard, where he plays a schoolteacher who has a spare-time drag act.

Television and cinema 
In the 1960s, he was part of Jean Nohain's team producing animated children's television, and performed the Baronne de la Tronche-en-Biais in a Guy Lux production.

In the 1970s he was part of many televised sketch shows. He also performed comic sketches and songs with humourist  on RTBF's . In France, he was a regular performer in short comic sketches, often in costume, on Guy Lux's programmes.

The 1970s saw his best cinema work. Sim also took part in the radio (and later television) programme Les Grosses Têtes, from its start in 1977, and was a regular panellist on the television game show .

He took part in directing the television series , in which he played the role of Théodore in many episodes, as well as other roles.

Death 
Sim died of a pulmonary embolism on 6 September 2009, aged 83, at the Bonnet community hospital in Fréjus, Var where he was being treated for pneumonia.

His funeral took place on 11 September 2009 at the Church of Saint Peter and Saint Paul in Roquebrune-sur-Argens, where he had lived for nine years. The celebrant was Father Jérôme Renard. He was cremated at Vidauban (Var) and his ashes scattered in the crematorium's garden of remembrance.

Filmography

References

External links 

 

1926 births
2009 deaths
People from Hautes-Pyrénées
French comedians
French humorists
French male writers
20th-century French comedians
20th-century French male writers
Deaths from pulmonary embolism